Jesús Angulo may refer to:

Jesús Ricardo Angulo (born 1997), Mexican football winger
Jesús Alberto Angulo (born 1998), Mexican football defender